Jay Lovestone (15 December 1897 – 7 March 1990) was an American activist. He was at various times a member of the Socialist Party of America, a leader of the Communist Party USA, leader of a small oppositionist party, an anti-Communist and Central Intelligence Agency (CIA) helper, and foreign policy advisor to the leadership of the AFL–CIO and various unions within it.

Biography

Background and early life
Lovestone was born Jacob Liebstein (Яков Либштейн Yakov Libshtein) into a Lithuanian Jewish family in a shtetl called Moǔchadz in Grodno Governorate (then part of the Russian Empire, now in Grodno Region, Belarus). His father, Barnet, had been a rabbi, but when he emigrated to America he had to settle for a job as shammes (caretaker). Barnet came first, then sent for his family the next year. Lovestone arrived with his mother, Emma, and his siblings, Morris, Esther and Sarah at Ellis island on September 15, 1907. They originally settled on Hester Street in Manhattan's Lower East Side, but later moved to 2155 Daly Avenue in the Bronx. The family did not know their dates of birth precisely, but they assigned Jacob the date of December 15, 1897.

Young Liebstein was attracted to socialist politics from his teens. While imbibing all the ideological currents in the vibrant New York Yiddish and English radical press, he was particularly attracted to the ideas of Daniel De Leon. It is not known whether he ever joined de Leon's Socialist Labor Party, but he was one of the 3,000 mourners who attended his funeral on May 11, 1914.

Liebstein entered City College of New York in 1915. Already a member of the Socialist party, he joined its unofficial student wing, the Intercollegiate Socialist Society. He became secretary and then president of the CCNY chapter. He also met William Weinstone and Bertram Wolfe in ISS, who would go on to become his factional allies in the Communist Party. He graduated in June 1918. In February 1919 he had his name legally changed to Jay Lovestone, the surname being a literal translation of Liebstein. (During the early 20th century such name changes were a common practice for Jewish immigrants who encountered widespread antisemitism in American society.) That year he also began studying at NYU Law School, but dropped out to pursue a career as a full-time Communist party member.

The Communist years (1919–1929)
His first foray into what would become the American Communist movement began in February 1919, when the left wing elements in the Socialist Party in New York began to organize themselves as a separate faction. Lovestone was on the original organizing committee, the Committee of 15, with Wolfe, John Reed and Benjamin Gitlow. That June he attended the National Conference of the Left Wing. He sided with the Fraina/Ruthenberg faction that opted to create a National Left Wing Council that would attempt to take over the Socialist Party. He stayed with this group after it reversed its stance, and joined the National Organizing Committee in founding the Communist Party of America on September 1, 1919, at a convention in Chicago.

In 1921, Lovestone became editor of the Communist Party newspaper, The Communist, and sat on the editorial board of The Liberator, the arts and letters publication of the Workers Party of America.  Upon the death of Charles Ruthenberg in 1927 he became the party's national secretary. From about 1923, the CP developed two main factions, the Pepper–Ruthenberg group and the Foster–Cannon group. Lovestone was a close adherent of the Pepper–Ruthenberg tendency, which was to be centered in New York City and to favor united-front political action in a "class Labor Party", as opposed to the Foster–Cannon group, which tended to be centered in Chicago and were most concerned with building a radicalized American Federation of Labor through a boring from within policy. 

In 1925 the leader of the Pepper–Ruthenberg faction, John Pepper, returned to Moscow for work in the apparatus of the Communist International, raising Lovestone's status to that of a chief lieutenant in a new Ruthenberg–Lovestone pairing. Foster and Cannon, on the other hand, parted ways, with Alexander Bittelman assuming the mantle as Foster's chief factional ally, while Jim Cannon built his power base in the party's legal defense mass organization, the International Labor Defense (ILD). 

With the Soviet Bolshevik party riven by a succession struggle following Lenin's death in January 1924, the factions in the US eventually corresponded with factions in the Soviet leadership, with Foster's faction being strongly supportive of Joseph Stalin and Lovestone's faction sympathetic to Nikolai Bukharin. As a result of his trip to the Comintern Congress in 1928 where James P. Cannon and Maurice Spector accidentally saw Leon Trotsky's thesis criticizing the direction of the Comintern, Cannon became a Trotskyist and decided to organize his faction in support of Trotsky's position. Cannon's support for Trotsky became known before he had fully mobilized his supporters. Lovestone led the expulsion of Cannon and his supporters in 1928.

The Communist opposition years (1929–1941)

When Stalin purged Bukharin from the Soviet Politburo in 1929, Lovestone suffered the consequences. A visiting delegation of the Comintern asked him to step down as party secretary in favor of his rival William Z. Foster. Lovestone refused and departed for the Soviet Union to argue his case.  Lovestone insisted that he had the support of the vast majority of the Communist Party and should not have to step aside. Stalin responded that he "had a majority because the American Communist Party until now regarded you as the determined supporters of the Communist International. And it was only because the Party regarded you as friends of the Comintern that you had a majority in the ranks of the American Communist Party".

When he returned to the US, Lovestone was forced to pay for his insubordination and was expelled from the party for his support of Bukharin and the Right Opposition and for his theory of American exceptionalism, which held that capitalism was more secure in the United States and thus socialists should pursue different, more moderate strategies there than elsewhere in the world. That contradicted Stalin's views and the new Third Period policy of ultra-leftism promoted by the Comintern. Lovestone and his friends had thought that they commanded the following of the mass of party members and, once expelled, optimistically named their new party the Communist Party (Majority Group). When the new group attracted only a few hundred members they changed its name to the Communist Party (Opposition). They were aligned with the International Communist Opposition, which had sections in fifteen countries. The CP(O) later became the Independent Communist Labor League and then, in 1938, the Independent Labor League of America, before dissolving in 1941. The party published the periodical Workers' Age (originally The Revolutionary Age), which was edited by Bertram Wolfe, along with a number of pamphlets.

Union and anti-communist activities
In 1944, David Dubinsky arranged to place Lovestone in the AFL's Free Trade Union Committee, where he worked out of the ILGWU's headquarters. Along with Irving Brown he led the activities of the American Institute for Free Labor Development, an organization sponsored by the AFL which worked internationally, organizing free labor unions in Europe and Latin America which were not Communist-controlled.

In connection with that work he cooperated closely with the CIA, feeding information about Communist labor-union activities to James Jesus Angleton, the CIA's counterintelligence chief, in order to undermine Communist influence in the international union movement and provide intelligence to the US government. He remained there until 1963 when he became  director of the AFL–CIO's International Affairs Department (IAD), which quietly sent millions of dollars from the CIA to aid anti-communist activities internationally, particularly in Latin America.

In 1973, AFL–CIO president George Meany discovered that Lovestone was still in contact with Angleton of the CIA, who was conducting illegal domestic spying activities, despite being told seven years earlier to terminate this relationship.

Meany chose to force Lovestone out by issuing an instruction with which he knew Lovestone would not comply. On March 6, 1974, he informed Lovestone that he wanted to close his New York office, stop publication of Free Trade Union News, and transfer Lovestone and his library and archives to Washington, D.C. When Lovestone argued he could not relocate his library of 6,000 books, he was dismissed, effective July 1. Lovestone's successor, Ernie Lee, maintained a low profile during his tenure from 1974 through 1982 and significantly scaled back the AFL–CIO's aggressive advocacy of a hawkish, anti-détente foreign policy.

Death and legacy
Lovestone died on March 7, 1990, at the age of 92.

Jay Lovestone's massive accumulation of papers, today encompassing more than 865 archival boxes, were acquired by the Hoover Institution Archives at Stanford University in 1975, where they remained sealed for 20 years. The material was opened to the public in 1995 and was a source for author Ted Morgan, who published the first full-length biography of Lovestone in 1999. An associate, Louise Page Morris, later supplemented the collection with her correspondence—according to other reports, Morris "spent 25 years as Lovestone's lover."

Lovestone's Federal Bureau of Investigation file is reported to be 5,700 pages long.

Bibliography

Communist Party years

 The Government — Strikebreaker: A Study of the Role of the Government in the Recent Industrial Crisis. New York: Workers Party of America, 1923.
 Blood and Steel: An Exposure of the 12-Hour Day in the Steel Industry. New York: Workers Party of America, n.d. [1923]
 What's What About Coolidge? Chicago, Workers Party of America, n.d. [] alternate link
 The LaFollette Illusion: As Revealed in an Analysis of the Political Role of Senator Robert M. LaFollette. Chicago: Literature Department, Workers Party of America, 1924.
 American Imperialism: The Menace of the Greatest Capitalist World Power. Chicago: Literature Department, Workers Party of America, n.d. [1925]
 The Party Organization (Introduction). Chicago: Daily Worker Publishing Co., n.d. [1925]
  Our Heritage from 1776: A Working Class View of the First American Revolution. With Wolfe, Bertram D. and William F. Dunne, New York: The Workers School, n.d. [1926]  alternate link
 The Labor Lieutenants of American Imperialism. New York: Daily Worker Publishing Co., 1927.
 The Coolidge Program: Capitalist Democracy and Prosperity Exposed. New York: Workers Library Publishers, 1927. (Workers library #2)
Ruthenberg, Communist fighter and leader (Introduction). New York: Workers Library Publishers, 1927.
 1928: The Presidential Election and the Workers. New York: Workers Library Publishers, 1928. (Workers library #4) Yiddish translation
 America Prepares the Next War. New York: Workers Library Publishers, 1928. (Workers library #10)
 Pages from Party History. New York: Workers Library Publishers, n.d. [February 1929].

Communist opposition years
 "Twelve Years of the Soviet Union," The Revolutionary Age, Vol. 1, no. 1 (November 1, 1929), pp. 7–8.
 The American Labor Movement: Its Past, Its Present, Its Future. New York: Workers Age Publishing Association, n.d. [1932].
 What Next for American Labor? New York: Communist Party of the United States (Opposition), n.d. [1934]
Marxian classics in the light of current history. New York City, New Workers School 1934
 Soviet Foreign Policy and the World Revolution. New York: Workers Age Publishers, 1935 alternate link
 People's Front Illusion: From "Social Fascism" to the "People's Front." New York: Workers Age Publishers, n.d. [1937].
 New Frontiers for Labor. New York: Workers Age Publishers, n.d. [1938]

Post-radical years
 The Big Smile: An Analysis of the Soviet "New Look." with Matthew Woll. New York: Free Trade Union Committee, American Federation of Labor, 1955.
 Communist and Workers' Parties' manifesto adopted November–December, 1960; Testimony of Jay Lovestone, January 26, February 2, 1961. Washington, D.C.: United States Government Printing Office, 1961.

Citations and references

Cited sources and further reading
 Alexander, Robert J. (1981). The Right Opposition: The Lovestoneites and the International Communist Opposition of the 1930s. Westport, CT: Greenwood Press.
 Devinatz, Victor G. (2002). "Reassessing The Historical UAW: Walter Reuther's Affiliation with the Communist Party and Something of Its Meaning — A Document of Party Involvement, 1939." Le Travail.
 Hirsch, Fred (1974). An Analysis of Our AFL-CIO Role in Latin America or Under the Covers with the CIA. San Jose, CA: F. Hirsch.
 LeBlanc, Paul, and Tim Davenport, eds. (2015). The "American Exceptionalism" of Jay Lovestone and His Comrades, 1929-1940: Dissident Marxism in the United States, Volume 1. Leiden, NL: Brill.
 
 Wilford, Hugh (2008). The Mighty Wurlitzer: How the CIA Played America. Cambridge, MA: Harvard University Press.

External links

 Grace M. Hawes (ed.), "Register of the Jay Lovestone Papers, 1906-1989," Hoover Institution Archives, Stanford University, 2008.
 Obituary from The New York Times

1897 births
1990 deaths
People from Baranavichy District
People from Slonimsky Uyezd
Belarusian Jews
Emigrants from the Russian Empire to the United States
American people of Belarusian-Jewish descent
Socialist Party of America politicians from New York (state)
Communist Party USA politicians
Right Opposition
American trade union leaders
Former Marxists
International Ladies Garment Workers Union leaders
Jewish socialists
Jewish anti-communists
City College of New York alumni
Commanders Crosses of the Order of Merit of the Federal Republic of Germany